Patrik Pulkkinen (born 14 March 2001) is a Finnish motorcycle racer. He raced in the 2017 Moto3 World Championship for Peugeot MC Saxoprint team. Pulkkinen was also a competitor in the Red Bull MotoGP Rookies Cup in 2015 and 2016.

Career statistics

Red Bull MotoGP Rookies Cup

Races by year
(key)

Grand Prix motorcycle racing

By season

Races by year

References

External links

2001 births
Living people
Finnish motorcycle racers
Moto3 World Championship riders
Sportspeople from Helsinki